NGC 7674 is a spiral galaxy located in the constellation Pegasus. It is located at a distance of circa 350 million light years from Earth, which, given its apparent dimensions, means that NGC 7674 is about 125,000 light years across. It was discovered by John Herschel on August 16, 1830.

Characteristics 
The galaxy is seen nearly face-on, at an inclination of 31 degrees. The central bar-shaped structure, measuring 15×5 arcseconds is made up of stars. The galaxy has two spiral arms that become broader as the distance increases. One arm vanishes at the point it overlaps with the nearby galaxy NGC 7674A. The shape of NGC 7674, including the long narrow streamers emanating northeast and northwest of the galaxy can be accounted for by tidal interactions with its companions. There is no dwarf galaxy seen inside the streamers. It is featured in Arp's Atlas of Peculiar Galaxies as number 182, in the category "galaxies with narrow filaments".

NGC 7674 has a powerful active nucleus of the kind known as a type 2 Seyfert that is perhaps fed by gas drawn into the center through the interactions with the companions.  In 1975, observations of excess ultraviolet emission led to designation as Markarian 533 in Markarian's catalog.  Later, using spectropolarimetry, emission characteristic of a hidden broad-line region (BLR), visible only in the polarized flux spectrum was detected, implying that the nucleus of NGC 7674 is an obscured type 1 Seyfert, hidden by a dust torus. In the center of NGC 7674 lies a supermassive black hole whose mass is estimated to be nearly  based on stellar velocity dispersion. When observed in radio waves, NGC 7674 features two radio jets with an S-shape, 0.7 kpc long. The reason for this shape may be a change in the black hole spin axis due to a minor merger, the presence of a binary black hole or due to interactions with the interstellar medium. Two radio sources with characteristics similar to accreting supermassive black holes have been observed in the centre of NGC 7674, at a projected separation of 0.35 parsec.

NGC 7674 falls into the family of luminous infrared galaxies, with its infrared luminosity being 1011.54 . The luminous infrared galaxies are characterised by intense star forming activity.

Two supernovae have been observed in NGC 7674, SN 2011ee (type Ic, mag 18.6) and SN 2011hb (type Ia, mag 18.8).

Nearby galaxies 
NGC 7674 is the brightest and largest member of the isolated Hickson 96 compact group of galaxies, consisting of four galaxies. NGC 7674 forms a pair with its smaller companion NGC 7674A, which lies 34 arcseconds to the north. NGC 7675, an elliptical galaxy, lies 2.2 arcminutes to the east.

References

External links 

NGC 7674 on SIMBAD

Unbarred spiral galaxies
Peculiar galaxies
Seyfert galaxies
Luminous infrared galaxies
Pegasus (constellation)
7674
12608
182
71504
Markarian 0533
Discoveries by John Herschel
Astronomical objects discovered in 1830